Keaton may refer to:
Keaton (name)
2712 Keaton, a main-belt asteroid named after Buster Keaton
Keatons, a race of fictional, fox-like creatures in The Legend of Zelda series of video games